Anolis ophiolepis, the five-striped grass anole or snakescale anole, is a species of lizard in the family Dactyloidae. The species is found on Isla de la Juventud in Cuba.

References

Anoles
Reptiles described in 1861
Endemic fauna of Cuba
Reptiles of Cuba
Taxa named by Edward Drinker Cope